Titanio basalis is a moth in the family Crambidae. It was described by Aristide Caradja in 1928. It is found in Xinjiang, China.

References

Moths described in 1928
Odontiini
Taxa named by Aristide Caradja
Insects of China